Khumukcham Joykisan Singh is an Indian politician and member of the Manipur Legislative Assembly representing Singh janata Dal (United).  Letter Khumukcham Joykisan Singh joint BJP 2 September 2022 Joykisan is elected from Thangmeiband Assembly Constituency.

He is a member Manipur Legislative Assembly from the Thangmeiband  constituency in Imphal West district.

References 

People from Imphal West district
Bharatiya Janata Party politicians from Manipur
Living people
Manipur politicians
Trinamool Congress politicians
21st-century Indian politicians
Year of birth missing (living people)
Janata Dal (United) politicians from Manipur
Manipur MLAs 2022–2027
Manipur MLAs 2012–2017
Manipur MLAs 2017–2022